Daniel Ross (born August 4, 1980) is an Emmy-winning American actor and producer. He won the inaugural Children's and Family Emmy Award for Outstanding Voice Performance in a Preschool Animated Program for his role as Donald Duck in Mickey and Minnie Wish Upon a Christmas.

Career
Ross is best known as the third person to have ever officially voiced Donald Duck, beginning with Mickey and the Roadster Racers/Mickey Mouse Mixed-Up Adventures and other specials and shorts. He has also portrayed the voices of Lucky the Leprechaun for Lucky Charms Cereal, Starscream, Hound, and Mixmaster in Transformers: The Game (2007). and most recently Gizmo and Stripe from the Gremlins franchise for the game Multiversus.

He can be seen in the movies, Ninjas vs. Zombies, Ninjas vs. Vampires, Ninjas vs. Monsters, as well as Eduardo Sanchez's Lovely Molly.

Filmography

Film

Television

Video games

Crew work

References

External links
Official website

1980 births
Living people
American male film actors
American male television actors
American male video game actors
American male voice actors
Disney people
Emmy Award winners
Male actors from Maryland
21st-century American male actors